La Chartre-sur-le-Loir (literally La Chartre on the Loir) is a commune in the Sarthe department in the Pays de la Loire region in north-western France.

The surviving church dedicated to St. Vincent was designed by the architect Delarue c. 1830. It possesses mid-nineteenth century stained glass depicting the saint and other personages.

Before the early nineteenth century there were also churches dedicated to St. Mary Magdalen and to St. Nicholas, and in close proximity a priory.

See also
Communes of the Sarthe department

References

Communes of Sarthe